William Henry Brown (18 June 1899 – 16 October 1967) was a New Zealand politician of the National Party.

Biography

Early life
Brown was born in Napier in 1899, the son of Henry Stafford Brown and his wife Ellen Susannah Brown (née Day).

Political career

He was a member of the Palmerston North City Council from 1931 to 1935. In 1953, he was awarded the Queen Elizabeth II Coronation Medal.

Brown first contested the Palmerston North electorate at the  against the incumbent, Philip Skoglund of the Labour Party. That year, Skoglund was confirmed by the voters. The election night results had Skoglund in the lead, narrowly, but special votes overturned the initial result in Brown's favour. The  was contested by Brown against Labour's Joe Walding, with Brown holding a 259-vote majority. Brown died in office in 1967. He was succeeded by Walding through a by-election later in 1967.

Death
Brown died on 16 October 1967 in Kaiapoi while speaking at a function after the opening a section of the Christchurch Northern Motorway.

References

1899 births
1967 deaths
New Zealand National Party MPs
Members of the New Zealand House of Representatives
New Zealand MPs for North Island electorates
Unsuccessful candidates in the 1957 New Zealand general election
Palmerston North City Councillors